The following radio stations broadcast on FM frequency 97.2 MHz:

China 
 CNR Business Radio in Shijiazhuang
 TJTRS Tianjin News Radio

Ireland
Shannonside FM in County Leitrim

Malaysia
 KL FM
 Sinar in Kuantan, Pahang

Singapore
 Love 97.2FM

United Kingdom
 Free Radio Shropshire & Black Country
 Q Radio in the north coast of Northern Ireland
 Greatest Hits Radio Harrogate and the Yorkshire Dales
Heart West from Witney and Swindon
Greatest Hits Radio South from Weymouth

References

Lists of radio stations by frequency